Ernest Lee Jones (born April 1, 1971) is a former professional American football player who played defensive lineman for four seasons for the New Orleans Saints, Denver Broncos, and Carolina Panthers.

References

1971 births
American football defensive linemen
Los Angeles Rams players
New Orleans Saints players
Denver Broncos players
Carolina Panthers players
Oregon Ducks football players
Living people
Sportspeople from Utica, New York
Players of American football from New York (state)